Lorient or L'Orient may refer to:

Lorient, a town in Brittany, France
FC Lorient, a French professional football league team
Lorient, Saint Barthélemy
L'Orient, Switzerland, a village forming part of the municipality of Le Chenit in Vaud, Switzerland
French ship L'Orient (1791), a French warship, sunk at the Battle of the Nile
Raid on Lorient, a 1746 British attempt to capture the town during the War of the Austrian Succession
L'Orient, Lebanese newspaper founded in 1924 that was merged in 1971 with Le Jour to form the L'Orient-Le Jour.

See also 
 Orient (disambiguation)